The Sports Ground in Kyiv, Ukraine was the first permanent sports stadium in the Russian Empire. It was opened on 12 August 1912, and used during the First All-Russian (Imperial) Olympiad in 1913. It was located in the old historic area of Lukianivka of Kyiv.

The Sports Ground was destroyed during World War I.

First All-Russian Olympiad 
One of the most prominent events in Kyiv at that time was the First All-Russian (Imperial) Olympics. Held in 1913 and dedicated to the opening of the All-Russian industrial exhibition celebrating 300 years of the rule of Romanov family. A stadium was built in Kyiv especially for the competitions – with race-tracks, a cycle-track as well as stands for 5,000 seats. The program of the Olympiad included such sports as track and field, marathon, soccer, wrestling, weight-lifting, fencing, swimming, gymnastics, equestrianism, bicycle and motorcycle racing along the Kyiv – Chernihiv – Kyiv route.

Notes

Literature 
 Перший стадіон в Києві // Старт.—1987.—No. 8. 
 Рибаков М.О. Невідомі та маловідомі сторінки історії Києва — К.: Кий, 1997. . 
 "Дзеркало тижня". — 2003.—30 серпня - 5 вересня. 
 Київ. Історична енциклопедія. З найдавніших часів до 1917 року 
 Вашъ Кiевъ — photos. 
 'Олімпіада на Лук'янівці' 

1912 establishments in Ukraine
Sports venues in Kyiv
History of Kyiv
Multi-purpose stadiums in Ukraine
1912 establishments in the Russian Empire